Ammaye Navvithe is a 2001 Telugu-language comedy film produced by V. Anand Prasad under the Sudha Art Productions banner and directed by V. Jyoti Kumar. It stars Rajendra Prasad, Bhavana  and music composed by M. M. Srilekha. The film was recorded as a flop at the box office.

Plot
Sundaram (Rajendra Prasad) is an unemployed guy in the village of Talamanchi, ruled by Seshadri Naidu (Ranganath), a feudal-era chieftain of his tribute. There is a Hindi lecturer post vacant in the college of Naidu and Sundaram wants that. Naidu is a glorified ruffian, and his protectiveness towards women actually makes it seem like a vice. He banishes people from the village for helping young lovers unite, makes college students start with an oath every day that all women are their sisters, pronounces the death sentence on men who attempt to outrage women, and generally makes himself look like some sort of extremist.

Sundaram gets the job by some clever manipulation and then does the unthinkable; he starts wooing Sireesha (Bhavana), a very intelligent girl, the daughter of Naidu. He thinks that whoever woos her deserves her, and you lose your last shred of sympathy for Sundaram. Of course, Naidu finds out Sundaram's designs and issues him an ultimatum, that if in 15 days he cannot get Sirisha to say I Love You, he'll be dead. The remaining story is whether Sundaram will be successful in gaining Sirisha's love.

Cast

Rajendra Prasad as Sundaram
Bhavana as Sirisha
Ranganath as Seshadri Naidu
Ahuti Prasad
Brahmanandam as D. D.
M. S. Narayana as Principal
L. B. Sriram
Prasad Babu
Navabharat Balaji
Tirupati Prakash
Gowtham Raju
Kallu Chidambaram as Bus Conductor
Satti Babu 
Jaya Sudha as Rajeswari
Rama Prabha
Siva Parvathi
Delhi Rajeswari
Sana
Shobha Rani
Alapati Lakshmi

Soundtrack

Music composed by M. M. Srilekha. Music released on TIPS Music Company.

References

External links 

2000s Telugu-language films